The pygmy fruit bat (Aethalops alecto), also known as the grey fruit bat, is a species of megabat.

Distribution
Three specimens were collected in April 1995 from Bario highlands in Sarawak. A. alecto is confined to montane forest above 1000 m from Peninsular Malaysia, Sumatra and Java. In Borneo it had been recorded at Mount Kinabalu and Crocker Range in Sabah; Gunung Mulu and Bareo in Sarawak (Payne et al. 1985 ).

Biology and ecology
Two adult females and an adult male collected from Bario were in a non-reproductive condition. Kitchener et al. (1990) reported a pregnant female collected on Lombok Island in October. Hill (1961) observed pregnancy in February and May in Peninsular Malaysia. Medway (1978) recorded that the months between February to June was the breeding period for the species.  This species appears to be confined to montane forest above 1,000 m (Payne et al. 1985).

External measurements
3 samples.  FA = 43.70-48.00, TL = none, EL = 10.00-12.00, TB = 15.30-17.00, WT = 12.00-18.00.
Measurements are referenced from Diaz. Measurements are without scale, but can only be millimeters. FA = Forearm Length, TL = Tail Length, EL = Ear Length, HFL = Hind Foot Length, TB is not described, and WT = usually W, is weight in grams.

Further measurements are referenced according to Barquez.
Measurements are referenced as GLS = Greater Length of Skull, Condylobasal Length (CBL), Least Interorbital Breadth (LIB), Zygomatic Breadth (ZB), Postorbital Constriction (PC), Breadth of Braincase (BB), Length of Maxillary Toothrow (LMxT), Palatial Length (PL), Mastoid Breadth (MB), Length of Mandibular Toothrow (LMdT), Length of Mandible (LM), Width across Upper Canines (CC), and Width across Upper Molars (MM).

References

 Hall LS, Gordon G. Grigg, Craig Moritz, Besar Ketol, Isa Sait, Wahab Marni and M.T. Abdullah. 2004. Biogeography of fruit bats in Southeast Asia. Sarawak Museum Journal LX(81):191-284
 Karim, C., A.A. Tuen and M.T. Abdullah. 2004. Mammals. Sarawak Museum Journal Special Issue No. 6. 80: 221—234.
 Mohd. Azlan J., Ibnu Maryanto, Agus P. Kartono and M.T. Abdullah. 2003 Diversity, Relative Abundance and Conservation of Chiropterans in Kayan Mentarang National Park, East Kalimantan, Indonesia. Sarawak Museum Journal 79: 251-265.
 Hall LS, Richards GC, Abdullah MT. 2002. The bats of Niah National Park, Sarawak. Sarawak Museum Journal. 78: 255-282.
Bat World Sanctuary
Bat Conservation International
ITIS

Aethalops
Bats of Southeast Asia
Bats of Indonesia
Bats of Malaysia
Mammals of Borneo
Fauna of Java
Fauna of Sumatra
Sarawak
Least concern biota of Asia
Mammals described in 1923
Taxa named by Oldfield Thomas